Mark Handforth (born in Hong Kong 1969) is a sculptor based in Miami, Florida. Some of his works are attributed to site-specific art. In 2007 he installed a sculpture titled Dallas Snake in the park of the Dallas Museum of Art. Four works are exhibited outside the Museum of Contemporary Art, Chicago through October 2011.

Education
Handforth grew up in London, England, and attended Staatliche Hochschule für Bildende Künste, Städelschule, Frankfurt am Main, Germany, and the Slade School of Fine Art at University College London.   Handforth moved to Miami, Florida, in 1992.

Work
Often focusing on large-scale sculpture, Handforth’s work reflects objects from public spaces—street signs, fluorescent lights, street lamps, and traffic cones. These objects are then altered as Handforth twists and bends them, covers some with wax from burning candles or dripping paint. A feature of many of Handforth’s exhibitions is his placement of works in a gallery space and the continuation of the exhibition outdoors, in front of or near the gallery or museum.

Handforth also works with fluorescent light tubes, creating representations of such things suns, stars, lightning bolts, or abstract designs placed on gallery walls. His work is often described as Minimalist, and his light sculptures are reminiscent of Dan Flavin’s work. His oversized sculptures reflect elements of Claes Oldenburg’s large-scale sculptures. Some critics also identify elements of Pop Art and Surrealism in his work. Handforth often takes objects from popular culture—such as a Vespa or a satellite dish—and turns them into art objects by reappropriating their use. Other cultural icons prominent in Handforth's work—the heart, star, and stop sign—are references to Pop Art.

The Public Art Fund sponsored Handforth's Lamppost (2003), which was installed at the Doris Freedman Plaza in Midtown Manhattan. Lamppost was the first of many outdoor works in his series of twisted and bent lampposts. The industrial lamppost was bent in two places so it would rest on the ground, and it lit the public space with glowing, red lights.   
          
Wishbone (2010) is a 7-½ foot tall aluminum sculpture on display outside of the Hessel Museum at Bard (2011). Handforth digitally enlarged an image of a chicken wishbone to produce the massive sculpture.

Selected works
Vespa, 2001
Lamppost, 2003, first displayed at the Doris Freedman Plaza in Midtown Manhattan, NY
Diamond Brite, 2004, first displayed at the Whitney Biennial
Northern Star, 2005
Stardust, 2005
Platz, 2007, on display Tessinerplaz, Zürich
Man on the Moon, 2009, first displayed at the 53rd International Art Exhibition, Venice, Italy
Wishbone, 2010
Blackbird, 2011

Selected collections
Dallas Museum of Art
Le Consortium
FRAC Centre
Museum of Contemporary Art, North Miami
Museum of Contemporary Art, Los Angeles
Francois Pinault Collection
Rachofsky Collection
Rubell Family Collection
Whitney Museum of American Art

Exhibitions
Handforth’s first solo museum show in the United States was held in 1996 the Museum of Contemporary Art, North Miami. The exhibition Mark Handforth: Rolling Stop was also the museum’s first Miami-based artist to receive a solo show. He exhibits at the museum again in 2011–2012.

Handforth's first solo show in the United Kingdom was in 2004 at The Modern Institute in Glasgow, Scotland, which again held exhibitions of his work in 2006 and 2010. The exhibition presented works such as Fire, neon light tubes mounted on a gallery wall; Volcano, a tree stump covered in colored wax from candles alight atop it; and Left, an oversized street sign bent into an S-shape.

Mark Handforth's outdoor exhibition (2011) on the Museum of Contemporary Art, Chicago’s plaza displays three large-scale and one small-scale work: PhoneBone combines an oversized femur set upright with an equally oversized yellow phone handset affixed to the bone’s side; LamppostSnake and Blackbird—a large, bent lamppost and a massive black aluminum hanger, respectively—sit atop the building’s plinths on either side of the staircase; BeatProp displays an English Bobby hat atop a safety cone, each colored with dripped paint.

Selected solo exhibitions
2011	Museum of Contemporary Art (MCA) Chicago Plaza Project
2010	Gavin Brown’s enterprise, New York
2008	Galerie Almine Rech, Paris
2007	Plaz, Galerie Eva Presenhuber/Tessinerplatz, Zurich
2006	The Modern Institute, offsite, Glasgow, Scotland
2005	Stroom, The Haghe, Netherlands
2004	Roma Roma Roma, Rome
2003	Lamppost, a Public Art Fund commission, New York, NY
2002	UCLA Hammer Museum, Los Angeles, CA
1997	Miami Arts Project, four bus shelters for Metro-Dade Art in Public Places, Miami, FL
1991	Galerie Krieg, Frankfurt am Main, Germany

Selected group exhibitions
2010	At Home/Not at Home, Hessel Museum of Art, New York, NY
2009	Tonite, The Modern Institute, Glasgow, Scotland
2008	The Freak Show, Musee de la Monnaie, Paris, France
2007	From Site to Site: Light Art in Parks, Villas, and Museums, Internationale Lichttage 	Winterthur, Switzerland
2006	The Uncertainty of Objects and Ideas, Hirshhorn Museum and Sculpture Garden, 	Washington, D.C.
2005	Light Art from Artificial Light, ZKM Museum for Contemporary Art, Karlsruhe, Germany
2004	Terminal 5, JKF Airport, New York, NY
2004      Whitney Biennial, Whitney Museum of American Art, New York, NY
2003	It Happened Tomorrow, Lyon Biennale, Lyon, France
2002	My head is on fire but my heart is full of love, Charlottenborg Exhibition Hall, 	Copenhagen, Denmark

Biography
1969 	  	Born in Hong Kong
1990–1991 	Staatliche Hochschule fur Bildende Kunste, Städelschule, Frankfurt am Main
1988–1992 	The Slade School of Fine Art, University College, London
1992–Present	  Lives and works in Miami, FL

Literature
2006 	   	The New Yorker, May 23, 2006, p. 20
2005 	   	Ribas, Joao, Review, in: Time Out, May 12–18, 2005, p. 74
2005 	   	Troncy, Eric, ‘Varadinis, Mirjam (ed): Mark Handforth’, Zürich: JRP Riniger, 2005 (exh. cat.) engl. and German
2005 	   	Lunn, Felicity, ‘Mark Handforth, Kunsthaus Zürich’, in: Artforum, No. XLIII, May 2005, p. 242
2005 	   	Von Burg, Dominique, ‘Crash im Schein von Neonlicht’, in: Zürichsee-Zeitung. Rechtes Ufer, March 21, 2005, p. 23
2005 	   	Bergflödt, Torbjörn, ‘Urbane Landschaft’, in: Südkurier, March 15, 2005, p. 11
2005 	   	‘Kunsthaus Zürich zeigt Plastiken von Mark Handforth’, in: www.dw-world.de, March 11, 2005
2005 	   	Basting, Barbara, ‘Trick mit Knick im Kandelaber’ in: Tages Anzeiger, March 2, 2005, p. 50
2005 	   	Herzog, Samuel, ‘Im Reich der Luxus-Vandalen: Mark Handforth im Kunsthaus Zürich’, in: Neue Zürcher Zeitung, February 26, 2005, p. 46
2005 	   	Frey, Lilith, ‘Es röhrt im Kunsthaus’, in: Blick, February 25, 2005, p. 21

Personal life 
Handforth is married to artist Dara Friedman. They live and work in Miami with their two daughters.

External links
artfacts.net
gavin-browns-enterprise
Museum of Contemporary Art Chicago

References

1969 births
Living people
20th-century American sculptors
Alumni of the Slade School of Fine Art
British sculptors
British male sculptors
21st-century American sculptors